Calcot may refer to:

Places in England
 Calcot, Berkshire
Calcot Mill
Calcot Park
 Calcot, Gloucestershire, a hamlet in the parish of Coln St Dennis
 Calcot Manor, a historic house 3 miles west of Tetbury, Gloucestershire

Other
Calçot, a variety of scallion or spring onion

See also 
Calcutt (disambiguation), including Calcott
Kalkot, a tehsil in northern Pakistan